Sutra of the Great Virtue of Wisdom is a 5th-century Chinese manuscript on silk brought from the Mogao Caves in Dunhuang, China.  It was brought to Europe by the Paul Pelliot (1878–1945), and it is now housed at the National Library of France in Paris.

Notes

Chinese manuscripts
Chinese classic texts